Dicle is a town and district of Diyarbakır Province, Turkey. The population was 8,436 in 2010. The Mayor is Felat Aygören from the HDP.

Dicle is the Kurdish and Turkish name of the Tigris river, which runs through the district and gave its name to it. The name derives from tighri- (arrow) from Avestan and cognate with "tîj, tîr" (sharp, arrow) in Kurdish and tigra- (sharp, pointed) in Old Persian. Some claim that it derives from through Akkadian Idiqlat from the original Sumerian name for the river, Idigna.

References

Kurdish settlements in Turkey
Populated places in Diyarbakır Province
Districts of Diyarbakır Province
Towns in Turkey
Zaza settlements